CKYY-FM (89.1 MHz) is a commercial radio station in Welland, Ontario, Canada, serving the Niagara Region. It is owned by Wellport Broadcasting, a subsidiary of R.B. Communications. It airs a country format and calls itself Country 89. The studios and offices for CKYY-FM and sister station CIXL-FM are on Forks Road on the Port Colborne - Welland border.  

CKYY-FM has an effective radiated power (ERP) of 564 watts average, with a peak of 3,100 watts. CKYY-FM uses a directional antenna to avoid its signal from interfering with stations in the U.S.  The transmitter is located on Matthews Road in Welland .

History
The station's founders received approval from the Canadian Radio-television and Telecommunications Commission (CRTC) on June 26, 2014, to construct a new English-language commercial FM station.   The station signed on the air on February 20, 2015.

On May 10, 2019, Stingray Group announced its intention to purchase R.B. Communications' two stations in Welland. The sale has since fallen through. Wellport/RB Communications remain sole owners, for the time being. In 2022, Wellport announced a new deal to sell CIXL and CKYY to My Broadcasting Corporation.

On September 20, 2022, the CRTC approved the change of ownership from R.B. Communications Ltd. to My Broadcasting Corporation.

References

External links

 

KYY
Kyy-Fm
Mass media in Welland
Radio stations established in 2015
Stingray Group radio stations
2015 establishments in Ontario